Browhouses is a settlement in Dumfries and Galloway, Scotland.

Browhouses is located near Gretna in Southern Scotland. This small settlement was the home of the Coulthard Family for almost 200 years.

Villages in Dumfries and Galloway